Monty Roy Grow (born September 4, 1971) is an American former college and professional football player who was a defensive back for two seasons in the National Football League (NFL).  He was born in Inverness, Florida, and attended Citrus High School in Inverness. He played college football for coach Steve Spurrier's Florida Gators football team while attending the University of Florida from 1990 to 1993.  He was signed by the NFL's Kansas City Chiefs in 1994, and also played for the Jacksonville Jaguars from 1995 to 1996.

Legal issues

In 2013, Grow was arrested for child abuse, after leaving his 3-year-old child locked in a car, without any adult supervision.
In 2016, Grow was arrested for being a leader in a massive healthcare-fraud conspiracy, and in 2018 was found guilty of 17 counts of health care fraud and money laundering.  He was sentenced to 22 years in prison in connection with the healthcare-fraud conviction and ordered to pay approximately $18 million in restitution.

On October 21, 2020, the United States Court of Appeals for the Eleventh Circuit found that the evidence was sufficient to support Grow’s convictions, and that the district court’s instructions to the jury were not coercive or prejudicial, and that Grow invited any error that the district court may have committed.  The Eleventh Circuit, however, vacated the sentence on Count I of the indictment and remanded the case for further proceedings.

References

External links
Just Sports Stats

1971 births
Living people
Players of American football from Florida
American football defensive backs
Florida Gators football players
Kansas City Chiefs players
Jacksonville Jaguars players
People from Inverness, Florida